Arthur Goodhart  may refer to:

 Arthur Murray Goodhart (1866–1941), British composer and organist
 Arthur Lehman Goodhart (1891–1978), American-born academic jurist and lawyer